The 1999 FIBA Africa Championship was the 20th FIBA Africa Championship, played under the rules of FIBA, the world governing body for basketball, and the FIBA Africa thereof. The tournament was hosted by Angola from July 29 to August 6, 1999.

Angola defeated Nigeria 79–72 in the final to win their fifth title. and securing a spot at the 2000 Summer Olympics.

Squads

Draw

Preliminary rounds 
Times given below are in UTC+1.

Group 1

Group 2

Knockout stage

5th place match

7th place match

Championship bracket

9th place match

11th place match

Bronze medal match

Final

Final standings

Awards

See also
 1998 FIBA Africa Clubs Champions Cup

External links
 FIBA Archive

References

Africa
1999 in African basketball
AfroBasket
International basketball competitions hosted by Angola
July 1999 sports events in Africa
August 1999 sports events in Africa